High Water I is the debut studio album by American rock band The Magpie Salute, released August 10, 2018 on Eagle Records. Produced by leader and guitarist Rich Robinson, it served as the follow up to their self-titled live album released one year prior. The band's follow-up High Water II was released October 18, 2019.

Track listing

Personnel 
The Magpie Salute

Marc Ford – guitars, vocals
John Hogg – vocals
Joe Magistro – drums, percussion
Sven Pipien – bass guitar, vocals
Rich Robinson – guitars, vocals
 Matt Slocum – keyboards, vocals

Additional musicians

Byron House – double bass
Dan Wistrom – pedal steel guitar

Production 

 Scott Fitzgerald – photography
Sean Genockey – mixer, recorder
Paul Q. Kolderie – mixer
David McClister – cover
Rich Robinson – production, photography
 Jim Taylor – engineer
Phil Yarnall – photography, design

References 

The Magpie Salute albums
2018 debut albums
Eagle Records albums